Haojiafu station is a station on Line 6 of the Beijing Subway. It is located in Lucheng, Tongzhou District. Construction began on September 20, 2012.

The station was opened on December 28, 2014.
The station was temporary closed on October 11, 2017 due to road construction.
It is reopened on November 9, 2018.

Station Layout 
The station has an underground island platform.

Exits 
There are 4 exits, lettered A, B, C, and D. Exits A and C are accessible.

Gallery

References

Beijing Subway stations in Tongzhou District
Railway stations in China opened in 2014